Moreni is a surname. Notable people with the surname include:

 Cristian Moreni (born 1972), Italian former road racing cyclist
 Gian Vincenzo Moreni (1932 – 1999), Italian prelate of the Catholic Church
 Mattia Bruno Moreni (1920–1999), Italian sculptor and painter.

See also 

 Moreno (surname)
 Moreni (disambiguation)

Italian-language surnames